The 1981–82 season was Atlético de Madrid's 41st season of History since foundation in 1903 and the club's 37th season in La Liga, the top league of Spanish football. Atlético competed in La Liga, the Copa del Rey, and the UEFA Cup.

Season
Atlético de Madrid acquired Mexican striker Hugo Sánchez from Club Universidad Nacional before the season began. After a difficult initial period, Sánchez became the club's leading scorer. At the end of the season, Atlético was obligated to make a second installment of the transfer payment to Pumas as they wanted to retain Sánchez for the following season.

Squad

Transfers

In

Out

Results

La Liga

League table

Matches

Copa del Rey

Third round

Fourth round

Eightfinals

Quarterfinals

UEFA Cup

First round

Squad statistics

Appearances and goals

Disciplinary record

References

External links
 Official website

Atlético Madrid seasons
Atlético Madrid